Christianity in the 1st century covers the formative history of Christianity from the start of the ministry of Jesus (–29 AD) to the death of the last of the Twelve Apostles and is thus also known as the Apostolic Age. Early Christianity developed out of the eschatological ministry of Jesus. Subsequent to Jesus' death, his earliest followers formed an apocalyptic messianic Jewish sect during the late Second Temple period of the 1st century. Initially believing that Jesus' resurrection was the start of the end time, their beliefs soon changed in the expected Second Coming of Jesus and the start of God's Kingdom at a later point in time.

Paul the Apostle, a Pharisee Jew who had persecuted the early Jewish Christians, converted –36 and started to proselytize among the Gentiles. According to Paul, Gentile converts could be allowed exemption from Jewish commandments, arguing that all are justified by their faith in Jesus. This was part of a gradual split of early Christianity and Judaism, as Christianity became a distinct religion including predominantly Gentile adherence.

Jerusalem had an early Christian community, which was led by James the Just, Peter, and John. According to Acts 11:26, Antioch was where the followers were first called Christians. Peter was later martyred in Rome, the capital of the Roman Empire. The apostles went on to spread the message of the Gospel around the classical world and founded apostolic sees around the early centers of Christianity.

Etymology

Early Jewish Christians referred to themselves as "The Way", probably coming from Isaiah 40:3, "prepare the way of the Lord." Since, the former was actually a quote of John the Baptizer about Yeshua, Jesus, more likely it connected to Yeshua's (Jesus') own words, declaring Himself the following, saying, "I am the WAY, the Truth, and the Life no one comes to the Father but by Me." (John 14:6) Other Jews also called them "the Nazarenes," while another Jewish-Christian sect called themselves "Ebionites" (lit. "the poor"). According to Acts 11:26, the term "Christian" was first used in reference to Jesus's disciples in the city of Antioch, meaning "followers of Christ," by the non-Jewish inhabitants of Antioch. The earliest recorded use of the term "Christianity" was by Ignatius of Antioch, in around 100 AD.

Origins

Jewish–Hellenistic background

The earliest followers of Jesus were a sect of apocalyptic Jewish Christians within the realm of Second Temple Judaism. The early Christian groups were strictly Jewish, such as the Ebionites, and the early Christian community in Jerusalem, led by James the Just, brother of Jesus. Christianity "emerged as a sect of Judaism in Roman Palestine" in the syncretistic Hellenistic world of the first century AD, which was dominated by Roman law and Greek culture. Hellenistic culture had a profound impact on the customs and practices of Jews everywhere. The inroads into Judaism gave rise to Hellenistic Judaism in the Jewish diaspora which sought to establish a Hebraic-Jewish religious tradition within the culture and language of Hellenism. Hellenistic Judaism spread to Ptolemaic Egypt from the 3rd century BC, and became a notable religio licita after the Roman conquest of Greece, Anatolia, Syria, Judea, and Egypt.

During the early first century AD there were many competing Jewish sects in the Holy Land, and those that became Rabbinic Judaism and Proto-orthodox Christianity were but two of these. Philosophical schools included Pharisees, Sadducees, and Zealots, but also other less influential sects, including the Essenes. The first century BC and first century AD saw a growing number of charismatic religious leaders contributing to what would become the Mishnah of Rabbinic Judaism; and the ministry of Jesus, which would lead to the emergence of the first Jewish Christian community.

A central concern in 1st century Judaism was the covenant with God, and the status of the Jews as the chosen people of God. Many Jews believed that this covenant would be renewed with the coming of the Messiah. Jews believed the Law was given by God to guide them in their worship of the Lord and in their interactions with each other, "the greatest gift God had given his people."

The Jewish messiah concept has its root in the apocalyptic literature of the 2nd century BC to 1st century BC, promising a future leader or king from the Davidic line who is expected to be anointed with holy anointing oil and rule the Jewish people during the Messianic Age and world to come. The Messiah is often referred to as "King Messiah" or malka meshiḥa in Aramaic.

Life and ministry of Jesus

Sources

Christian sources, such as the four canonical gospels, the Pauline epistles, and the New Testament apocrypha, include detailed stories about Jesus, but scholars differ on the historicity of specific episodes described in the Biblical accounts of Jesus. The only two events subject to "almost universal assent" are that Jesus was baptized by John the Baptist and was crucified by the order of the Roman Prefect Pontius Pilate. The Gospels are theological documents, which "provide information the authors regarded as necessary for the religious development of the Christian communities in which they worked." They consist of short passages, pericopes, which the Gospel-authors arranged in various ways as suited their aims.

Non-Christian sources that are used to study and establish the historicity of Jesus include Jewish sources such as Josephus, and Roman sources such as Tacitus. These sources are compared to Christian sources such as the Pauline epistles and the Synoptic Gospels. These sources are usually independent of each other (e.g. Jewish sources do not draw upon Roman sources), and similarities and differences between them are used in the authentication process.

Historical person

There is widespread disagreement among scholars on the details of the life of Jesus mentioned in the gospel narratives, and on the meaning of his teachings. Scholars often draw a distinction between the Jesus of history and the Christ of faith, and two different accounts can be found in this regard.

Critical scholarship has discounted most of the narratives about Jesus as legendary, and the mainstream historical view is that while the gospels include many legendary elements, these are religious elaborations added to the accounts of a historical Jesus who was crucified under the Roman prefect Pontius Pilate in the 1st-century Roman province of Judea. His remaining disciples later believed that he was resurrected.

Academic scholars have constructed a variety of portraits and profiles for Jesus. Contemporary scholarship places Jesus firmly in the Jewish tradition, and the most prominent understanding of Jesus is as a Jewish apocalyptic prophet or eschatological teacher. Other portraits are the charismatic healer, the Cynic philosopher, the Jewish Messiah, and the prophet of social change.

Ministry and eschatological expectations

In the canonical gospels, the ministry of Jesus begins with his baptism in the countryside of Roman Judea and Transjordan, near the Jordan River, and ends in Jerusalem, following the Last Supper with his disciples.
 The Gospel of Luke states that Jesus was "about 30 years of age" at the start of his ministry. A chronology of Jesus typically has the date of the start of his ministry estimated at around AD 27–29 and the end in the range AD 30–36.

In the Synoptic Gospels (Matthew, Mark and Luke), Jewish eschatology stands central. After being baptized by John the Baptist, Jesus teaches extensively for a year, or maybe just a few months, about the coming Kingdom of God (or, in Matthew, the Kingdom of Heaven), in aphorisms and parables, using similes and figures of speech.
In the Gospel of John, Jesus himself is the main subject.

The Synoptics present different views on the Kingdom of God. While the Kingdom is essentially described as eschatological (relating to the end of the world), becoming reality in the near future, some texts present the Kingdom as already being present, while other texts depict the Kingdom as a place in heaven that one enters after death, or as the presence of God on earth.. Jesus talks as expecting the coming of the "Son of Man" from heaven, an apocalyptic figure who would initiate "the coming judgment and the redemption of Israel." According to Davies, the Sermon on the Mount presents Jesus as the new Moses who brings a New Law (a reference to the Law of Moses, the Messianic Torah.

Death and resurrection

Jesus' life was ended by his execution by crucifixion. His early followers believed that three days after his death, Jesus rose bodily from the dead. Paul's letters and the Gospels contain reports of a number of post-resurrection appearances. Progressively, Jewish scriptures were reexamined in light of Jesus's teachings to explain the crucifixion and visionary post-mortem experiences of Jesus, and the resurrection of Jesus "signalled for earliest believers that the days of eschatological fulfilment were at hand." Some New Testament accounts were understood not as mere visionary experiences, but rather as real appearances in which those present are told to touch and see.

The resurrection of Jesus gave the impetus in certain Christian sects to the exaltation of Jesus to the status of divine Son and Lord of God's Kingdom and the resumption of their missionary activity. His followers expected Jesus to return within a generation and begin the Kingdom of God.

Apostolic Age

Traditionally, the period from the death of Jesus until the death of the last of the Twelve Apostles is called the Apostolic Age, after the missionary activities of the apostles. According to the Acts of the Apostles the Jerusalem church began at Pentecost with some 120 believers, in an "upper room," believed by some to be the Cenacle, where the apostles received the Holy Spirit and emerged from hiding following the death and resurrection of Jesus to preach and spread his message.

The New Testament writings depict what orthodox Christian churches call the Great Commission, an event where they describe the resurrected Jesus Christ instructing his disciples to spread his eschatological message of the coming of the Kingdom of God to all the nations of the world. The most famous version of the Great Commission is in Matthew 28, where on a mountain in Galilee Jesus calls on his followers to make disciples of and baptize all nations in the name of the Father, the Son, and the Holy Spirit.

Paul's conversion on the Road to Damascus is first recorded in Acts 9. Based on this, the Antioch church was founded. It is also believed that it was Antioch where the name Christian was first used.

Jewish Christianity

After the death and resurrection of Jesus, Christianity first emerged as a sect of Judaism as practiced in the Roman province of Judea. The first Christians were all Jews, who constituted a Second Temple Jewish sect with an apocalyptic eschatology. Among other schools of thought, some Jews regarded Jesus as Lord and resurrected messiah, and the eternally existing Son of God, expecting the second coming of Jesus and the start of God's Kingdom. They pressed fellow Jews to prepare for these events and to follow "the way" of the Lord. They believed Yahweh to be the only true God, the god of Israel, and considered Jesus to be the messiah (Christ), as prophesied in the Jewish scriptures, which they held to be authoritative and sacred. They held faithfully to the Torah, including acceptance of Gentile converts based on a version of the Noachide laws.

The Jerusalem ekklēsia

The New Testament's Acts of the Apostles and Epistle to the Galatians record that an early Jewish Christian community centered on Jerusalem, and that its leaders included Peter, James, the brother of Jesus, and John the Apostle.
The Jerusalem community "held a central place among all the churches," as witnessed by Paul's writings.
Reportedly legitimised by Jesus' appearance, Peter was the first leader of the Jerusalem ekklēsia.
Peter was soon eclipsed in this leadership by James the Just, "the Brother of the Lord," which may explain why the early texts contain scant information about Peter. According to Lüdemann, in the discussions about the strictness of adherence to the Jewish Law, the more conservative faction of James the Just gained the upper hand over the more liberal position of Peter, who soon lost influence. According to Dunn, this was not an "usurpation of power," but a consequence of Peter's involvement in missionary activities. The relatives of Jesus were generally accorded a special position within this community, which also contributed to the ascendancy of James the Just in Jerusalem.

According to a tradition recorded by Eusebius and Epiphanius of Salamis, the Jerusalem church fled to Pella at the outbreak of the First Jewish–Roman War (AD 66–73).

The Jerusalem community consisted of "Hebrews," Jews speaking both Aramaic and Greek, and "Hellenists," Jews speaking only Greek, possibly diaspora Jews who had resettled in Jerusalem. According to Dunn, Paul's initial persecution of Christians probably was directed against these Greek-speaking "Hellenists" due to their anti-Temple attitude. Within the early Jewish Christian community, this also set them apart from the "Hebrews" and their Tabernacle observance.

Beliefs and practices

Creeds and salvation

The sources for the beliefs of the apostolic community include oral traditions (which included sayings attributed to Jesus, parables and teachings), the Gospels, the New Testament epistles and possibly lost texts such as the Q source and the writings of Papias.

The texts contain the earliest Christian creeds expressing belief in the resurrected Jesus, such as : 

The creed has been dated by some scholars as originating within the Jerusalem apostolic community no later than the 40s, and by some to less than a decade after Jesus' death, while others date it to about 56. Other early creeds include 1 John 4, 2 Timothy 2 Romans 1 and 1 Timothy 3.

Christology

Two fundamentally different Christologies developed in the early Church, namely a "low" or adoptionist Christology, and a "high" or "incarnation Christology." The chronology of the development of these early Christologies is a matter of debate within contemporary scholarship.

The "low Christology" or "adoptionist Christology" is the belief "that God exalted Jesus to be his Son by raising him from the dead," thereby raising him to "divine status." According to the "evolutionary model" c.q. "evolutionary theories," the Christological understanding of Christ developed over time, as witnessed in the Gospels, with the earliest Christians believing that Jesus was a human who was exalted, c.q. adopted as God's Son, when he was resurrected. Later beliefs shifted the exaltation to his baptism, birth, and subsequently to the idea of his eternal existence, as witnessed in the Gospel of John. This evolutionary model was very influential, and the "low Christology" has long been regarded as the oldest Christology.

The other early Christology is "high Christology," which is "the view that Jesus was a pre-existent divine being who became a human, did the Father’s will on earth, and then was taken back up into heaven whence he had originally come," and from where he appeared on earth. According to Hurtado, a proponent of an Early High Christology, the devotion to Jesus as divine originated in early Jewish Christianity, and not later or under the influence of pagan religions and Gentile converts. The Pauline letters, which are the earliest Christian writings, already show "a well-developed pattern of Christian devotion [...] already conventionalized and apparently uncontroversial."

Some Christians began to worship Jesus as a Lord.

Eschatological expectations

Ehrman and other scholars believe that Jesus' early followers expected the immediate installment of the Kingdom of God, but that as time went on without this occurring, it led to a change in beliefs. In time, the belief that Jesus' resurrection signaled the imminent coming of the Kingdom of God changed into a belief that the resurrection confirmed the Messianic status of Jesus, and the belief that Jesus would return at some indeterminate time in the future, the Second Coming, heralding the expected endtime. When the Kingdom of God did not arrive, Christians' beliefs gradually changed into the expectation of an immediate reward in heaven after death, rather than to a future divine kingdom on Earth, despite the churches' continuing to use the major creeds' statements of belief in a coming resurrection day and world to come.

Angels and Devils 
Coming from a Jewish background, early Christians believed in angels (derived from the Greek word for "messengers"). Specifically, early Christians wrote in the New Testament books that angels "heralded Jesus' birth, Resurrection, and Ascension; ministered to Him while He was on Earth; and sing the praises of God through all eternity." Early Christians also believed that protecting angels—assigned to each nation and even to each individual—would herald the Second Coming, lead the saints into Paradise, and cast the damned into Hell." Satan ("the adversary"), similar to descriptions in the Old Testament, appears in the New Testament "to accuse men of sin and to test their fidelity, even to the point of tempting Jesus."

Practices
The Book of Acts reports that the early followers continued daily Temple attendance and traditional Jewish home prayer, Jewish liturgical, a set of scriptural readings adapted from synagogue practice, and use of sacred music in hymns and prayer. Other passages in the New Testament gospels reflect a similar observance of traditional Jewish piety such as baptism, fasting, reverence for the Torah, and observance of Jewish holy days.

Baptism

Early Christian beliefs regarding baptism probably predate the New Testament writings. It seems certain that numerous Jewish sects and certainly Jesus's disciples practised baptism. John the Baptist had baptized many people, before baptisms took place in the name of Jesus Christ. Paul likened baptism to being buried with Christ in his death.

Communal meals and Eucharist

Early Christian rituals included communal meals. The Eucharist was often a part of the Lovefeast, but between the latter part of the 1st century AD and 250 AD the two became separate rituals. Thus, in modern times the Lovefeast refers to a Christian ritual meal distinct from the Lord's Supper.

Liturgy

During the first three centuries of Christianity, the Liturgical ritual was rooted in the Jewish Passover, Siddur, Seder, and synagogue services, including the singing of hymns (especially the Psalms) and reading from the scriptures. Most early Christians did not own a copy of the works (some of which were still being written) that later became the Christian Bible or other church works accepted by some but not canonized, such as the writings of the Apostolic Fathers, or other works today called New Testament apocrypha. Similar to Judaism, much of the original church liturgical services functioned as a means of learning these scriptures, which initially centered around the Septuagint and the Targums.

At first, Christians continued to worship alongside Jewish believers, but within twenty years of Jesus' death, Sunday (the Lord's Day) was being regarded as the primary day of worship.

Emerging church – mission to the Gentiles

With the start of their missionary activity, early Jewish Christians also started to attract proselytes, Gentiles who were fully or partly converted to Judaism.

Growth of early Christianity 

Christian missionary activity spread "the Way" and slowly created early centers of Christianity with Gentile adherents in the predominantly Greek-speaking eastern half of the Roman Empire, and then throughout the Hellenistic world and even beyond the Roman Empire. Early Christian beliefs were proclaimed in kerygma (preaching), some of which are preserved in New Testament scripture. The early Gospel message spread orally, probably originally in Aramaic, but almost immediately also in Greek. A process of cognitive dissonance reduction may have contributed to intensive missionary activity, convincing others of the developing beliefs, reducing the cognitive dissonance created by the delay of the coming of the endtime. Due to this missionary zeal, the early group of followers grew larger despite the failing expectations.

The scope of the Jewish-Christian mission expanded over time. While Jesus limited his message to a Jewish audience in Galilee and Judea, after his death his followers extended their outreach to all of Israel, and eventually the whole Jewish diaspora, believing that the Second Coming would only happen when all Jews had received the Gospel. Apostles and preachers traveled to Jewish communities around the Mediterranean Sea, and initially attracted Jewish converts. Within 10 years of the death of Jesus, apostles had attracted enthusiasts for "the Way" from Jerusalem to Antioch, Ephesus, Corinth, Thessalonica, Cyprus, Crete, Alexandria and Rome. Over 40 churches were established by 100, most in Asia Minor, such as the seven churches of Asia, and some in Greece in the Roman era and Roman Italy.

According to Fredriksen, when early Christians broadened their missionary efforts, they also came into contact with Gentiles attracted to the Jewish religion. Eventually, the Gentiles came to be included in the missionary effort of Hellenised Jews, bringing "all nations" into the house of God. The "Hellenists," Greek-speaking diaspora Jews belonging to the early Jerusalem Jesus-movement, played an important role in reaching a Gentile, Greek audience, notably at Antioch, which had a large Jewish community and significant numbers of Gentile "God-fearers." From Antioch, the mission to the Gentiles started, including Paul's, which would fundamentally change the character of the early Christian movement, eventually turning it into a new, Gentile religion. According to Dunn, within 10 years after Jesus' death, "the new messianic movement focused on Jesus began to modulate into something different ... it was at Antioch that we can begin to speak of the new movement as 'Christianity'."

Christian groups and congregations first organized themselves loosely. In Paul's time there were no precisely delineated territorial jurisdictions for bishops, elders, and deacons.

Paul and the inclusion of Gentiles

Conversion

Paul's influence on Christian thinking is said to be more significant than that of any other New Testament author. According to the New Testament, Saul of Tarsus first persecuted the early Jewish Christians, but then converted. He adopted the name Paul and started proselytizing among the Gentiles, calling himself "Apostle to the Gentiles."

Paul was in contact with the early Christian community in Jerusalem, led by James the Just. According to Mack, he may have been converted to another early strand of Christianity, with a High Christology. Fragments of their beliefs in an exalted and deified Jesus, what Mack called the "Christ cult," can be found in the writings of Paul. Yet, Hurtado notes that Paul valued the linkage with "Jewish Christian circles in Roman Judea," which makes it likely that his Christology was in line with, and indebted to, their views. Hurtado further notes that "[i]t is widely accepted that the tradition that Paul recites in 1 Corinthians 15:1-7 must go back to the Jerusalem Church."

Inclusion of Gentiles

Paul was responsible for bringing Christianity to Ephesus, Corinth, Philippi, and Thessalonica. According to Larry Hurtado, "Paul saw Jesus' resurrection as ushering in the eschatological time foretold by biblical prophets in which the pagan 'Gentile' nations would turn from their idols and embrace the one true God of Israel (e.g.), and Paul saw himself as specially called by God to declare God's eschatological acceptance of the Gentiles and summon them to turn to God."
According to Krister Stendahl, the main concern of Paul's writings on Jesus' role and salvation by faith is not the individual conscience of human sinners and their doubts about being chosen by God or not, but the main concern is the problem of the inclusion of Gentile (Greek) Torah-observers into God's covenant.
The inclusion of Gentiles into early Christianity posed a problem for the Jewish identity of some of the early Christians: the new Gentile converts were not required to be circumcised nor to observe the Mosaic Law. Circumcision in particular was regarded as a token of the membership of the Abrahamic covenant, and the most traditionalist faction of Jewish Christians (i.e., converted Pharisees) insisted that Gentile converts had to be circumcised as well.
By contrast, the rite of circumcision was considered execrable and repulsive during the period of Hellenization of the Eastern Mediterranean,

and was especially adversed in Classical civilization both from ancient Greeks and Romans, which instead valued the foreskin positively.

Paul objected strongly to the insistence on keeping all of the Jewish commandments, considering it a great threat to his doctrine of salvation through faith in Christ. According to Paula Fredriksen, Paul's opposition to male circumcison for Gentiles is in line with the Old Testament predictions that "in the last days the gentile nations would come to the God of Israel, as gentiles (e.g.), not as proselytes to Israel." For Paul, Gentile male circumcision was therefore an affront to God's intentions. According to Larry Hurtado, "Paul saw himself as what Munck called a salvation-historical figure in his own right", who was "personally and singularly deputized by God to bring about the predicted ingathering (the "fullness") of the nations."

For Paul, Jesus' death and resurrection solved the problem of the exclusion of Gentiles from God's covenant, since the faithful are redeemed by participation in Jesus' death and rising. For Paul, it gained a deeper significance, providing "a basis for the salvation of sinful Gentiles apart from the Torah." According to E. P. Sanders, Paul argued that "those who are baptized into Christ are baptized into his death, and thus they escape the power of sin [...] he died so that the believers may die with him and consequently live with him." By this participation in Christ's death and rising, "one receives forgiveness for past offences, is liberated from the powers of sin, and receives the Spirit." Paul insists that salvation is received by the grace of God; according to Sanders, this insistence is in line with Second Temple Judaism of c. 200 BC until 200 AD, which saw God's covenant with Israel as an act of grace of God. Observance of the Law is needed to maintain the covenant, but the covenant is not earned by observing the Law, but by the grace of God.

These divergent interpretations have a prominent place in both Paul's writings and in Acts. His purpose was to compare his Gospel with theirs, an event known as the Council of Jerusalem. According to Paul, in his letter to the Galatians, they agreed that his mission was to be among the Gentiles. According to Acts, Paul made an argument that circumcision was not a necessary practice, vocally supported by Peter.

While the Council of Jerusalem was described as resulting in an agreement to allow Gentile converts exemption from most Jewish commandments, in reality a stark opposition from "Hebrew" Jewish Christians remained, as exemplified by the Ebionites. The relaxing of requirements in Pauline Christianity opened the way for a much larger Christian Church, extending far beyond the Jewish community. The inclusion of Gentiles is reflected in Luke-Acts, which is an attempt to answer a theological problem, namely how the Messiah of the Jews came to have an overwhelmingly non-Jewish church; the answer it provides, and its central theme, is that the message of Christ was sent to the Gentiles because the Jews rejected it.

Persecutions

Persecution of Christians in the Roman Empire occurred sporadically over a period of over two centuries. For most of the first three hundred years of Christian history, Christians were able to live in peace, practice their professions, and rise to positions of responsibility. Sporadic persecution took place as the result of local pagan populations putting pressure on the imperial authorities to take action against the Christians in their midst, who were thought to bring misfortune by their refusal to honour the gods.

Only for approximately ten out of the first three hundred years of the church's history were Christians executed due to orders from a Roman emperor. The first persecution of Christians organised by the Roman government took place under the emperor Nero in 64 AD after the Great Fire of Rome. There was no empire-wide persecution of Christians until the reign of Decius in the third century. The Edict of Serdica was issued in 311 by the Roman emperor Galerius, officially ending the Diocletianic persecution of Christianity in the East. With the passage in 313 AD of the Edict of Milan, in which the Roman Emperors Constantine the Great and Licinius legalised the Christian religion, persecution of Christians by the Roman state ceased.

Development of the Biblical canon

In an ancient culture before the printing press and the majority of the population illiterate, most early Christians likely did not own any Christian texts. Much of the original church liturgical services functioned as a means of learning Christian theology. A final uniformity of liturgical services may have become solidified after the church established a Biblical canon, possibly based on the Apostolic Constitutions and Clementine literature. Clement (d. 99) writes that liturgies are "to be celebrated, and not carelessly nor in disorder" but the final uniformity of liturgical services only came later, though the Liturgy of St James is traditionally associated with James the Just.

Books not accepted by Pauline Christianity are termed biblical apocrypha, though the exact list varies from denomination to denomination.

Old Testament

The Biblical canon began with the Jewish Scriptures. The Koine Greek translation of the Jewish scriptures, later known as the Septuagint and often written as "LXX," was the dominant translation from very early on.

Perhaps the earliest Christian canon is the Bryennios List, dated to around 100, which was found by Philotheos Bryennios in the Codex Hierosolymitanus. The list is written in Koine Greek, Aramaic and Hebrew. In the 2nd century, Melito of Sardis called the Jewish scriptures the "Old Testament" and also specified an early canon.

Jerome (347–420) expressed his preference for adhering strictly to the Hebrew text and canon, but his view held little currency even in his own day.

New Testament

The New Testament (often compared to the New Covenant) is the second major division of the Christian Bible. The books of the canon of the New Testament include the Canonical Gospels, Acts, letters of the Apostles, and Revelation. The original texts were written by various authors, most likely sometime between c. AD 45 and 120 AD, in Koine Greek, the lingua franca of the eastern part of the Roman Empire, though there is also a minority argument for Aramaic primacy. They were not defined as "canon" until the 4th century. Some were disputed, known as the Antilegomena.

Writings attributed to the Apostles circulated among the earliest Christian communities. The Pauline epistles were circulating, perhaps in collected forms, by the end of the 1st century AD.

Early orthodox writings – Apostolic Fathers
The Church Fathers are the early and influential Christian theologians and writers, particularly those of the first five centuries of Christian history. The earliest Church Fathers, within two generations of the Twelve Apostles of Christ, are usually called Apostolic Fathers for reportedly knowing and studying under the apostles personally. Important Apostolic Fathers include Clement of Rome (d. AD 99), Ignatius of Antioch (d. AD 98 to 117) and Polycarp of Smyrna (AD 69–155). The earliest Christian writings, other than those collected in the New Testament, are a group of letters credited to the Apostolic Fathers. Their writings include the Epistle of Barnabas and the Epistles of Clement. The Didache and Shepherd of Hermas are usually placed among the writings of the Apostolic Fathers, although their authors are unknown.

Taken as a whole, the collection is notable for its literary simplicity, religious zeal and lack of Hellenistic philosophy or rhetoric. They contain early thoughts on the organisation of the Christian ekklēsia, and are historical sources for the development of an early Church structure.

In his letter 1 Clement, Clement of Rome calls on the Christians of Corinth to maintain harmony and order. Some see his epistle as an assertion of Rome's authority over the church in Corinth and, by implication, the beginnings of papal supremacy. Clement refers to the leaders of the Corinthian church in his letter as bishops and presbyters interchangeably, and likewise states that the bishops are to lead God's flock by virtue of the chief shepherd (presbyter), Jesus Christ.

Ignatius of Antioch advocated the authority of the apostolic episcopacy (bishops).

The Didache (late 1st century) is an anonymous Jewish-Christian work. It is a pastoral manual dealing with Christian lessons, rituals, and Church organization, parts of which may have constituted the first written catechism, "that reveals more about how Jewish-Christians saw themselves and how they adapted their Judaism for Gentiles than any other book in the Christian Scriptures."

Split of early Christianity and Judaism

Split with Judaism

There was a slowly growing chasm between Gentile Christians, and Jews and Jewish Christians, rather than a sudden split. Even though it is commonly thought that Paul established a Gentile church, it took a century for a complete break to manifest. Growing tensions led to a starker separation that was virtually complete by the time Jewish Christians refused to join in the Bar Kokhba Jewish revolt of 132. Certain events are perceived as pivotal in the growing rift between Christianity and Judaism.

The destruction of Jerusalem and the consequent dispersion of Jews and Jewish Christians from the city (after the Bar Kokhba revolt) ended any pre-eminence of the Jewish-Christian leadership in Jerusalem. Early Christianity grew further apart from Judaism to establish itself as a predominantly Gentile religion, and Antioch became the first Gentile Christian community with stature.

The hypothetical Council of Jamnia c. 85 is often stated to have condemned all who claimed the Messiah had already come, and Christianity in particular, excluding them from attending synagogue. However, the formulated prayer in question (birkat ha-minim) is considered by other scholars to be unremarkable in the history of Jewish and Christian relations.
There is a paucity of evidence for Jewish persecution of "heretics" in general, or Christians in particular, in the period between 70 and 135. It is probable that the condemnation of Jamnia included many groups, of which the Christians were but one, and did not necessarily mean excommunication. That some of the later church fathers only recommended against synagogue attendance makes it improbable that an anti-Christian prayer was a common part of the synagogue liturgy. Jewish Christians continued to worship in synagogues for centuries.

During the late 1st century, Judaism was a legal religion with the protection of Roman law, worked out in compromise with the Roman state over two centuries (see Anti-Judaism in the Roman Empire for details). In contrast, Christianity was not legalized until the 313 Edict of Milan. Observant Jews had special rights, including the privilege of abstaining from civic pagan rites. Christians were initially identified with the Jewish religion by the Romans, but as they became more distinct, Christianity became a problem for Roman rulers. Around the year 98, the emperor Nerva decreed that Christians did not have to pay the annual tax upon the Jews, effectively recognizing them as distinct from Rabbinic Judaism. This opened the way to Christians being persecuted for disobedience to the emperor, as they refused to worship the state pantheon.

From c. 98 onwards a distinction between Christians and Jews in Roman literature becomes apparent. For example, Pliny the Younger postulates that Christians are not Jews since they do not pay the tax, in his letters to Trajan.

Later rejection of Jewish Christianity
Jewish Christians constituted a separate community from the Pauline Christians but maintained a similar faith. In Christian circles, Nazarene later came to be used as a label for those faithful to Jewish Law, in particular for a certain sect. These Jewish Christians, originally the central group in Christianity, generally holding the same beliefs except in their adherence to Jewish law, were not deemed heretical until the dominance of orthodoxy in the 4th century. The Ebionites may have been a splinter group of Nazarenes, with disagreements over Christology and leadership. They were considered by Gentile Christians to have unorthodox beliefs, particularly in relation to their views of Christ and Gentile converts. After the condemnation of the Nazarenes, Ebionite was often used as a general pejorative for all related "heresies".

There was a post-Nicene "double rejection" of the Jewish Christians by both Gentile Christianity and Rabbinic Judaism. The true end of ancient Jewish Christianity occurred only in the 5th century. Gentile Christianity became the dominant strand of orthodoxy and imposed itself on the previously Jewish Christian sanctuaries, taking full control of those houses of worship by the end of the 5th century.

Timeline

See also

 Christian martyrs
 Christianity and Judaism
 Christianization
 Christian symbolism#Early Christian symbols
 Chronological list of saints in the 1st century
 Council of Jerusalem
 Classical antiquity
 Early centers of Christianity
 Early Christian art and architecture
 Hellenistic Judaism
 History of Christian theology
 History of Christianity
 History of the Eastern Orthodox Church
 History of the Catholic Church
 Historiography of early Christianity
 Jesuism
 Mandaeism
 Persecution of Christians in the New Testament
 Persecution of Christians in the Roman Empire
 
 Timeline of Christian missions
 Timeline of Christianity
 Timeline of the Catholic Church
 Christianization of the Roman Empire as diffusion of innovation

Notes

References

Sources 
Printed sources

 
 
 
 
 
 
 Brown, Schuyler. The Origins of Christianity: A Historical Introduction to the New Testament. Oxford University Press (1993). 
 
 

 
 
 
 
 
 
 
 

 
 
 
 
 
 
 
 
 
 
 

 
 
 
 
 
 
 

 
 
 

 
 

 
 
 
 

Johnson, L.T., The Real Jesus, San Francisco, Harper San Francisco, 1996

 
 
 
 

 
 
 
Ludemann, Gerd, What Really Happened to Jesus? trans. J. Bowden, Louisville, Kentucky: Westminster John Knox Press, 1995
 

 
 
 
 
 
 
 

 Comprehensive survey
 
 
 

 
 
 
 

 
 

 
 

 
 
 
 

 
 

 
 
 
 
 
 
 
 

Web-sources

Further reading

Books
 Bockmuehl, Markus N.A. (ed.) The Cambridge Companion to Jesus. Cambridge University Press (2001). .
 Bourgel, Jonathan, From One Identity to Another: The Mother Church of Jerusalem Between the Two Jewish Revolts Against Rome (66–135/6 EC). Paris: Éditions du Cerf, collection Judaïsme ancien et Christianisme primitive, (French). 
 Brown, Raymond E.: An Introduction to the New Testament
 Conzelmann, H. and Lindemann A., Interpreting the New Testament. An Introduction to the Principles and Methods of N.T. Exegesis, translated by S.S. Schatzmann, Hendrickson Publishers. Peabody 1988.
 Dormeyer, Detlev. The New Testament among the Writings of Antiquity (English translation), Sheffield 1998
 Dunn, James D.G. (ed.) The Cambridge Companion to St. Paul. Cambridge University Press (2003). .
 Dunn, James D.G. Unity and Diversity in the New Testament: An Inquiry into the Character of Earliest Christianity. SCM Press (2006). .
 
 
 Freedman, David Noel (Ed). Eerdmans Dictionary of the Bible. Wm. B. Eerdmans Publishing (2000). 
 
 Mack, Burton L.: Who Wrote the New Testament?, Harper, 1996
 Mills, Watson E. Acts and Pauline Writings. Mercer University Press (1997). .
 Malina, Bruce J.: Windows on the World of Jesus: Time Travel to Ancient Judea. Westminster John Knox Press: Louisville (Kentucky) 1993
 Malina, Bruce J.: The New Testament World: Insights from Cultural Anthropology. 3rd edition, Westminster John Knox Press Louisville (Kentucky) 2001
 Malina, Bruce J.: Social Science Commentary on the Gospel of John Augsburg Fortress Publishers: Minneapolis 1998
 Malina, Bruce J.: Social-Science Commentary on the Synoptic Gospels Augsburg Fortress Publishers: Minneapolis 2003
 McKechnie, Paul. The First Christian Centuries: Perspectives on the Early Church. Apollos (2001). 
 Stegemann, Ekkehard and Stegemann, Wolfgang: The Jesus Movement: A Social History of Its First Century. Augsburg Fortress Publishers: Minneapolis 1999
 Stegemann, Wolfgang, The Gospel and the Poor. Fortress Press. Minneapolis 1984 
Thiessen, Henry C. Introduction to the New Testament, Eerdmans Publishing Company, Grand Rapids 1976
 Wilson, Barrie A. "How Jesus Became Christian". St. Martin's Press (2008). .
 Wright, N.T., "The New Unimproved Jesus", in Christianity Today, 1993-09-13
 Zahn, Theodor, Introduction to the New Testament, English translation, Edinburgh, 1910.

Book series

External links

New Testament Reading Room Extensive online NT resources (incl. commentaries), Tyndale Seminary
Scholarly articles on the New Testament from the Wisconsin Lutheran Seminary Library
Internet Ancient History Sourcebook: Christian Origins
Guide to Early Church Documents

 
01
01
Early Christianity and Judaism